I Hate Myself and Want to Die: The 52 Most Depressing Songs You've Ever Heard is a popular book by Tom Reynolds. It was published in 2005. In this book, Reynolds analyses 52 songs and ranks them in order of what he thinks is the most depressing. The three songs at the top of his list are "The Christmas Shoes" by Christian rock band NewSong, Harry Chapin's "The Shortest Story", and Bobby Goldsboro's "Honey"

The book was reviewed in The Sunday Times, NME, Entertainment Weekly and others. The title is a reference to a Nirvana song.

See also
 List of music considered the worst

Notes

2005 non-fiction books